Thermobiotes mytilogeiton is a species of deep-water eel in the family Synaphobranchidae. It is the only member of its genus. It is so far known only from the Vai Lili hydrothermal vent area in the western central Pacific Ocean at a depth of 1750 meters.

References

Synaphobranchidae
Fish described in 1991